Trapelus megalonyx, the Afghan ground agama, is a species of agama found in Pakistan, Afghanistan, Iran, and India.

References

Trapelus
Lizards of Asia
Taxa named by Albert Günther
Reptiles described in 1864